The 2019 Tour de Suisse was a road cycling stage race that took place between 15 and 23 June 2019 in Switzerland. It was the 83rd edition of the Tour de Suisse and the 26th race of the 2019 UCI World Tour.

Teams
In total, twenty-one teams started the race, with each team having seven riders.

Pre-race favourites
Before the start of the race, Geraint Thomas was the favourite to win, with his teammate Egan Bernal as the second favourite. From the rest of the field, Enric Mas, Rui Costa and Marc Soler were considered as the nearest rivals.

Route

Stages

Stage 1
15 June 2019 — Langnau im Emmental to Langnau im Emmental,  (Individual time trial)

Stage 2
16 June 2019 — Langnau im Emmental to Langnau im Emmental,

Stage 3
17 June 2019 — Flamatt to Murten,

Stage 4
18 June 2019 — Murten to Arlesheim, 

Geraint Thomas, the pre-race favourite, crashed during the stage and abandoned the race.

Stage 5
19 June 2019 — Münchenstein to Einsiedeln,

Stage 6
20 June 2019 — Einsiedeln to Flumserberg,

Stage 7
21 June 2019 — Unterterzen to San Gottardo,

Stage 8
22 June 2019 — Goms to Goms,   (Individual time trial)

Stage 9
23 June 2019 — Ulrichen to Ulrichen,

Classification leadership table

Final classification standings

General classification

Points classification

Mountains classification

Young rider classification

Teams classification

References

2019
2019 UCI World Tour
2019 in Swiss sport
June 2019 sports events in Switzerland